This is a list of every player to have been listed in the Australian Football League or the AFL Women's for the Brisbane Lions in the club's history.

Players are listed in order of debut, and the start of their Brisbane Lions career is determined by their year of debut, and the end is determined by the year of their final game playing for the Brisbane Lions. This guideline results in the possibility that players may not have necessarily begun or finished their career on the Brisbane Lions' list within these periods listed.

AFL players

Other AFL-listed players

Listed players yet to make their debut for Brisbane

Formerly listed players who never played a senior game for Brisbane

2022 COVID contingency list
For the 2022 season, clubs were permitted a supplementary list of 20 state league players, who would be available to play in the AFL if players were unavailable due to the league's health and safety protocols during the COVID-19 pandemic. Brisbane selected VFL players from Coburg, Port Melbourne and their own reserves team. None played an AFL game for the Lions.

AFL Women's players

Other AFL Women's-listed players

Listed players yet to make their debut for Brisbane

Formerly listed players who never played a senior game for Brisbane

External links 
All-time Brisbane Lions player list

Brisbane Lions

Brisbane
Lions